Ghvada is a village in the Ochamchira District of Abkhazia, Georgia.

Notable residents
 Nugzar Ashuba – Abkhaz politician, Speaker of the People's Assembly of Abkhazia (2002–2012)

References

Bibliography
 Georgian Soviet Encyclopedia Vol. 10, p. 586, 1986.

Populated places in Ochamchira District
Sukhum Okrug